Stanghella is a comune (municipality) in the Province of Padua in the Italian region Veneto, located about  southwest of Venice and about  southwest of Padua.

Stanghella borders the following municipalities: Boara Pisani, Granze, Pozzonovo, Solesino, Vescovana.

Demographic evolution

Twin towns
Stanghella is twinned with:

  Jardin, Isère, France, since 2002

References

Cities and towns in Veneto